Henry "Hank" Sylvern (born Henry Silverstein, March 26, 1908 – July 4, 1964) was an American keyboardist, composer, conductor and arranger.

Early life and career
Born and raised in Brooklyn, New York, Sylvern was the eldest of three children born to Herman Silverstein and Mary Sheflin. He began his music studies at the Paris Conservatory and later attended New York University. 

Silvern's first nationwide exposure came via his 1941 collaboration with lyricist Ruth Poll, "I'm a Military Man Now," which, at Treasury Secretary Henry Morgenthau's request, was unveiled on the premiere broadcast of a revamped version of the U.S. Treasury's wartime radio series, The Treasury Hour—Millions for Defense.

Subsequently, Sylvern worked on many radio and television shows, some of which are listed below:
Nick Carter, Master Detective, radio series, 1943
Arthur Godfrey Time, 1945, radio series, 1945  
Suspense, 1949, TV series; musical director
Tom Corbett, Space Cadet, 1950, TV series; theme song composer
USA Canteen (aka The Jane Froman Show), 1952, TV series; orchestra leader and musical director
The Phil Silvers Show (aka Sergeant Bilko, "You'll Never Get Rich"), 1955, TV series
Dotto, 1958, TV series
Make a Face 1961, TV series

He was also an organist who played music for innumerable radio shows and also wrote the following radio show theme songs:

Mark Trail, The Adventures of Rin Tin Tin, Space Academy, Strike It Rich

Sylvern recorded a Christmas album named Christmas in Hi-Fi (Organ, Bells, Chimes).  He also wrote the music for an MGM children's story-telling LP record (CH-103), The Wonderful World of Fairy Tales.  He played the organ while Robert Q. Lewis told The Ugly Duckling, The Pied Piper of Hamelin, The Sleeping Beauty, The Steadfast Tin Soldier, Jack and the Beanstalk, Rapunzel, Beauty and the Beast, Rumpelstiltskin, Pinocchio, Thumbelina, The Little Mermaid, and The Wizard of Oz stories.

Between 1945 and 1949, Sylvern worked alongside his second wife, Jeanne Harrison—she as director, he as musical director—on a number of radio programs, most notably Adventures of Boston Blackie.<ref>Terrace, Vincent (1999). Radio Programs, 1924-1984 : A Catalog of Over 1800 Shows. Jefferson, NC: McFarland & Company. p. 49. .</ref> In addition they recorded two records for children.

In June 1950, Sylvern was named "outstanding musical director of radio and TV for 1949-50" by Song Hits Magazine. In 1956, he was elected to the Board of Governors of the Academy of Television Arts & Sciences Foundation.

Personal life and death
Sylvern was married at least twice: first—from January 7, 1934 until her death on January 12, 1942—to Pearl Flexer,"New York, New York City Municipal Deaths, 1795-1949", database, FamilySearch (https://www.familysearch.org/ark:/61903/1:1:2WRP-KLB : 13 May 2022), Pearl Silverstein, 1942. with whom he had a daughter, Bryna, and then—from February 2, 1946 until their divorce, circa spring 1952"Marriages". Variety. February 6, 1946. p. 62. Retrieved February 14, 2023.Walker, Danton (May 20, 1953). "Broadway: Broadway Beat". New York Daily News. p. 64. Retrieved March 15, 2023.—to radio and TV producer-director, Jeanne—aka "Jean"—Harrison.Schwarz, Dan (June 1948). "Watts With Marriage? Famous radio couples prove that career and marriage do mix!". Swing. pp. 75–76, 83. Retrieved March 14, 2023.Seaman, Barbara (1996). Lovely Me : The Story of Jacqueline Susann. New York: Seven Stories Press. p. 222. .

On July 4, 1964, Sylvern died of undisclosed causes at his home in the Turtle Bay neighborhood of Manhattan.
References

Further reading
 "Picked Squad of Times' Winners". Times Union. April 20, 1928. p. 55.
 "Wet Feet Gave Boro Musician Key to Success". The Brooklyn Daily Eagle. June 2, 1946. p. 8a.
 Kerner, Fred (June 18, 1949). "Jean Harrison: One of Radio's Top Directors Is Housewife and Mother Too". The Kingston Whig-Standard. p. 18.
 "For TV Thrillers". Etude''. March 1950. p. 52.

External links
Hank Sylvern at IMDb
Hank Sylvern at Discogs

1908 births
1964 deaths
American radio personalities
RCA Victor artists